I-set domains are found in several cell adhesion molecules, including vascular (VCAM), intercellular (ICAM), neural (NCAM) and mucosal addressin (MADCAM) cell adhesion molecules, as well as junction adhesion molecules (JAM). I-set domains are also present in several other diverse protein families, including several tyrosine-protein kinase receptors, the hemolymph protein hemolin, the muscle proteins titin, telokin, and twitchin, the neuronal adhesion molecule axonin-1, and the signalling molecule semaphorin 4D that is involved in axonal guidance, immune function and angiogenesis.

Human proteins containing this domain 
 ADAMTSL1, ADAMTSL3, ALPK3, AXL,
 BOC,
 C9orf94, CADM2, CADM4, CCDC141, CDON, CEACAM7, CHL1, CILP2, CNTN1, CNTN2, CNTN3, CNTN4, CNTN5, CNTN6, CXADR,
 DCC, DSCAM, DSCAML1,
 ESAM,
 FGFR1, FGFR3, FGFR4, FGFRL1, FLT1, FLT4, FSTL4, FSTL5,
 HMCN1, HNT, HSPG2,
 ICAM5, IGFBP7, IGFBPL1, IGSF10, IGSF22, IGSF9, ISLR,
 KALRN, KAZALD1, KDR, KIAA0626, KIRREL, KIRREL2, KIRREL3,
 L1CAM, LINGO1, LINGO2, LRFN2, LRFN3, LRFN4, LRFN5, LRIG1, LRIG2, LRIG3, LRIT2, LRIT3, LRRC24, LRRC4B, LRRC4C, LRRN1, LRRN3, LRRN5, LSAMP,
 MAG, MDGA2, MFAP3L, MUSK, MXRA5, MYBPC1, MYBPC2, MYBPC3, MYBPH, MYBPHL, MYLK, MYOM1, MYOM2, MYOM3, MYOT, MYPN,
 NCAM1, NCAM2, NEGR1, NEO1, NEXN, NFASC, NGL1, NOPE, NPHS1, NPTN, NRCAM, NRG2, NT, NTRK2, NTRK3,
 OBSCN, OBSL1, OPCML,
 PALLD, PAPLN, PDGFRA, PRODH2, PTK7, PTPRD, PTPRF, PTPRS, PTPsigma, PUNC,
 ROBO1, ROBO2, ROBO3, ROBO4, ROR1, ROR2,
 SDK1, SDK2, SIGLEC1, SIGLEC6, SPEG,
 TRIO, TTN,
 UNC5A, UNC5B, UNC5C,
 VCAM1, WFIKKN1, WFIKKN2,

References

Protein domains
Single-pass transmembrane proteins